Little Alberta is a mountain located east of Habel Creek in the Canadian Rockies of Jasper National Park. The mountain was named in 1984 after nearby Mount Alberta.

The Alpine Club of Canada (ACC) operates the Lloyd MacKay Hut on a rocky shoulder of Little Alberta.

References

External links
 Little Alberta in the Canadian Mountain Encyclopedia.

Two-thousanders of Alberta
Mountains of Jasper National Park
Winston Churchill Range